Club Deportivo Español was a professional club and the club has won two First Division titles in the professional era. The club is based in Barinas.

Honours

National
Venezuelan Primera División: 2
Winners (2): 1946, 1959
Runner-up (1): 1958

Football clubs in Venezuela